Cahit Özkan (born 25 December 1976 in Denizli, Turkey) is a Turkish politician and member of Turkish Parliament. He is also Deputy for Denizili and a member of the Justice and Development Party.

Biography 
Cahit studied at Istanbul University's Faculty of Law and studied legal English in London.

Özkan received a master's degree in private law from the University of Kocaeli and in the field of human rights at Bilgi University in Istanbul.

His thesis was, “Trial Procedures in the European Court of Human Rights”.

References 

Living people
1976 births